The 2020 World Mixed Doubles Curling Championship was scheduled to be held from April 18 to 25 at the Kelowna Curling Club in Kelowna, Canada. On March 14, 2020, the event was cancelled due to the COVID-19 pandemic. The event was scheduled to be held in conjunction with the 2020 World Senior Curling Championships.

The event was supposed to score Olympic qualifying points for the participating nations. Upon cancellation, the qualifying process was left unclear.  It was later announced that any country that was scheduled to compete in the event and did not qualify through the 2021 World Championships will take part in an expanded final Olympic Qualification tournament that will be held in December 2021.

Teams
The teams were to be:

References

External links
Official Website

World Mixed Doubles Curling Championship
World Mixed Doubles Curling Championship
World Mixed Doubles Curling Championship
World Mixed Doubles Curling Championship